Critz is an unincorporated community in Patrick County, Virginia, United States. Critz has a post office with ZIP code 24082. Hardin Reynolds Memorial School and the Reynolds Homestead are located in Critz.

References

Unincorporated communities in Patrick County, Virginia
Unincorporated communities in Virginia